Randy Armstrong (born December 3, 1951) is an American musician, guitarist, multi-instrumentalist, composer, and bandleader. Armstrong plays mainly world fusion, ethno jazz and new age music and was a founding member of Do’a / Do’a World Music Ensemble (aka Do’ah). He is the bandleader for the Randy Armstrong Trio and Randy Armstrong World Fusion Ensemble and a founding member of the contemporary jazz/world fusion music group, Unu Mondo. He currently performs solo and with Beyond Borders. He has released and appeared on dozens of albums, film, theatre and dance score recordings as a soloist, accompanist and with all his ensembles. He made the Top 10 of the Billboard New Age Music Charts, with Do’ah's album, World Dance on the Global Pacific/CBS Associated label.

Armstrong performs from a collection of over 300 instruments from around the world. He has composed and recorded numerous scores for film, television, theater and dance.

Early life

Armstrong was born in Elkins, West Virginia. He grew up in Columbus, Ohio during his school years and graduated from Eastmoor High School in 1969. He is a follower of the Baháʼí Faith.

Education

Armstrong graduated with a B.A. in Music Performance and Composition / World Music Studies from Columbia Pacific University in 1983. Subsequently, his World Music studies continued at the University of Ghana-Legon. He has studied West African drumming with Babatunde Olatunji and various other West African drummers.

Musical career

Career beginnings 
At the age of 15, Armstrong joined the regional rock band The Gears, recording two singles under the Counterpart and Hillside Record labels, respectively. Armstrong also joined and toured with the rock and R&B band Annie Oakley.

During the late 60's and early 70's, Armstrong was greatly influenced by the civil and equal rights movements and anti-Vietnam War demonstrations.

Do’a/Do’ah (1974–1991)

In 1973, Armstrong moved to New Hampshire and in 1974, met classically trained flute player Ken LaRoche and with him formed the music group Do’a (a Persian word meaning "a call to prayer and meditation"). Armstrong and LaRoche composed and recorded music that fused western classical, jazz and folk music traditions with music influences and instruments around the world. They were signed to a four-album contract with Philo Records distributed by Rounder Records.

In 1986, Do’a World Music Ensemble received official recognition from the United Nations for their concert tour promoting the International Year of Peace.

In 1989, their album World Dance, which was published on the Global Pacific/CBS Associated label, reached the Top 10 on the Billboard chart for New Age music.

Unu Mondo (1992–1998)

In 1992, Armstrong co-founded the Contemporary Jazz / World Fusion music group, Unu Mondo with bassist and composer Volker Nahrmann. In 1994 their album, Hand in Hand was released and featured vocals from Spanish singer Olga Román, saxophone player Charlie Jennison and Brazilian drummer, Henrique De Almeida. Unu Mondo appeared on the compilation albums, World Visions – The Rhythms, Ageless Pathway and Enlightened Minds released by Global Pacific Records in 1996. The ensemble toured throughout United States.

Randy Armstrong Trio and other groups (1998–2015)

In 1998 through 2000, Armstrong was commissioned to score and record the original soundtrack for the PBS television series, Dinner on the Diner, filmed in South Africa, Spain, Scotland and Southeast Asia (Thailand and Malaysia). Armstrong’s soundtrack for the series was released by Ellipsis Arts in 2000. After returning from a trip to Italy in 2001, Armstrong recorded his solo guitar album, No Regrets, originally released by UMP Records in 2002 and subsequently re-released by the Los Angeles-based Domo Record label in 2003.

Armstrong formed the Randy Armstrong Trio and World Fusion Ensemble with fellow musicians bassist Volker Nahrmann; drummer Jose Roman Duque; African drummer/dancer Theo Nii Martey and Shamou on world percussion and vocals.

Beyond Borders (2015–present)

In 2015, Armstrong formed the Beyond Borders octet with bassist, keyboardist and composer Volker Nahrmann. They recorded the album Beyond Borders, which was released on the UMP label.

The album Beyond Borders was nominated for Best World Album by the 2015 ZMR Music Awards.

After returning from a tour in South Africa with the all-women’s chorus, Voices From The Heart in 2018, Armstrong commissioned a handmade set of South African marimbas and formed Randy Armstrong and WorldBeat Marimba in 2019.

Career in music education 

Armstrong is also active in arts education in New Hampshire, where he currently resides.

He has served as an Arts Councilor for the New Hampshire State Council on the Arts from 2003 to 2012 appointed by Governor Craig Benson and reappointed by Governor John Lynch. Armstrong also served on the board of directors of the New Hampshire Alliance for Arts Education. After the signing of the Good Friday Agreement in 1998, Armstrong was selected as an artist representative to attend a Cultural Trade Mission to Ireland, Northern Ireland and England sponsored by Governor Jeanne Shaheen of New Hampshire and in May 2005 attended a Curatorial Research trip on Son Jarocho music in Xalapa and Veracruz, Mexico for the Boston based New England Foundation for the Arts.

Armstrong was the director of the African Drumming and World Percussion Ensemble and instructor of North Indian sitar and tabla at Phillips Exeter Academy in New Hampshire from 1991 to 2020. Since 2002, he has taught graduate courses at Plymouth State University. He received the 2017 New Hampshire Governor's Arts Award for Arts Education and was an artist in residence with the Portsmouth Symphony Orchestra in 2017-2018.

Armstrong is on the juried artist rosters of the New Hampshire State Council on the Arts for Arts Education and Arts In Health.

Armstrong also performs and conducts artist-in-residence programs with Genevieve Aichele, founder of the New Hampshire Theater Project. They have released two storytelling and music albums, World Tales Volume 1 in 1996 and World Tales Volume 2 in 2007 on the UMP label.

Discography

Solo and Ensembles

Compilations

Collaborations/Accompanist

Selected Film, Video, Television Scores

Selected Theatre & Dance Scores

References

External links

Living people
1951 births
American male guitarists
American male composers
American multi-instrumentalists
Musicians from West Virginia
Columbia Pacific University alumni
American Bahá'ís
20th-century Bahá'ís
21st-century Bahá'ís
People from Elkins, West Virginia
American jazz musicians